Goldhammer is a surname. Notable people with the surname include:

Arthur Goldhammer (born 1946), American translator and academic
Leo Goldhammer (1884–1949), Israeli journalist, lawyer, sociologist, and statistician
Rio Goldhammer (born 1990), British musician

See also